Shameela Aslam is a Pakistani politician who was a Member of the Provincial Assembly of the Punjab, from 2008 to May 2018.

Early life and education
She was born in Multan.

She earned the degree of Bachelor of Education in 1985 and the degree of Master of Arts in Islamic Studies in 1989 from Bahauddin Zakariya University.

Political career

She was elected to the Provincial Assembly of the Punjab as a candidate of Pakistan Muslim League (N) (PML-N) on a reserved seat for women in 2008 Pakistani general election.

She was re-elected to the Provincial Assembly of the Punjab as a candidate of PML-N on a reserved seat for women in 2013 Pakistani general election.

References

Living people
Women members of the Provincial Assembly of the Punjab
Punjab MPAs 2013–2018
Punjab MPAs 2008–2013
Pakistan Muslim League (N) politicians
Year of birth missing (living people)
21st-century Pakistani women politicians